Dice of Destiny is a 1920 American silent crime drama film directed by Henry King and starring H. B. Warner, Lillian Rich, and Howard Davies.

Cast
 H. B. Warner as Jimmy Doyle 
 Lillian Rich as Nancy Preston 
 Howard Davies as Dave Monteith 
 Harvey Clark as Joe Caffey 
 J.P. Lockney as Bill Preston 
 Claude Payton as James Tierney 
 Fred Huntley as 'Gloomy' Cole 
 Rosemary Theby as Agnes

References

Bibliography
 Donald W. McCaffrey & Christopher P. Jacobs. Guide to the Silent Years of American Cinema. Greenwood Publishing, 1999.

External links

1920 films
1920 crime films
American crime films
Films directed by Henry King
American silent feature films
1920s English-language films
American black-and-white films
Pathé Exchange films
1920s American films
Silent crime drama films
Silent American drama films